Brian Doherty may refer to:

 Brian Doherty (drummer) (active from 1981), American musician, producer, and educator
 Brian Doherty (journalist) (born 1968), American journalist and author
 Brian Doherty (politician) (born 1957), American alderman for Chicago, former amateur boxer
 Brian Doherty (guitarist), Canadian guitarist for Big Wreck